"I Still Believe in You" is a song co-written and recorded by American country music singer Vince Gill.  It was released in June 1992 as the first single from his album of the same name. The song reached the top of the Billboard Hot Country Singles & Tracks (now Hot Country Songs) chart. It was written by Gill and John Barlow Jarvis.  The song was covered by Jazz artist Warren Hill featuring singer Mitch Malloy in 1993 and English rock band Bad Company on their 1996 CD Stories Told & Untold with Robert Hart on lead vocals.

"I Still Believe in You" debuted at number 55 on the U.S. Billboard Hot Country Singles & Tracks for the week of July 4, 1992.

Content
The narrator apologizes to his romantic partner for being selfish and not spending enough time with her, and vows to make it up to her.

Critical reception
Deborah Evans Price, of Billboard magazine reviewed the song favorably calling it "a pristine ballad embraced by one of country's most finely refined vocalists." She goes on to say that it contains "delivery and production strong enough to pull on the ears of other formats."

Music video
The music video was filmed in Joliet, Illinois at the Rialto Square Theatre.  The video was directed by John Lloyd Miller and premiered in mid-1992. It shows Gill singing on stage with a microphone while seated to an empty auditorium. Before the music begins, as Gill is walking into the theater, the sound of paparazzi can be heard in the background. It ends with Vince leaving the theater, his image disappearing before the screen fades to black.

Charts

Weekly charts

Year-end charts

References

1992 singles
Vince Gill songs
Bad Company songs
Songs written by Vince Gill
Song recordings produced by Tony Brown (record producer)
MCA Records singles
Music videos directed by John Lloyd Miller
Songs written by John Barlow Jarvis
1992 songs